The Podolsko Bridge is an arch bridge that spans the Vltava between Podolsko and Temešvár in Písek District, Czech Republic. At the time of its completion in 1942, it was the longest arch bridge in Czechoslovakia. In May 1945 during World War II, elements of the U.S. 4th Armored Division took over the western end of the bridge and near by village of Temesvar, marking the farthest point the Western Allied Powers moved East on the Western Front.

Design was by the Ministry of Public Works. Experimental Stress Analysis photoelasticity was by Jaroslav Josef Polívka of the University of California.

After the Orlík Dam was completed in 1961, the Vltava rose 19 meters and covered part of the supports.

References
"Contractor Meets Close Design Tolerances in Building Long-Span Concrete Arch Bridge"  J. J. Polivika, Civil Engineering, ASCE American Society of Civil Engineers January 1949
Philosophy of Structures By Eduardo Torroja [ English Version by J. J. Polivka and Milos Polivka ] (Figure 14:10b, page 221), University of California Press, Berkeley and Los Angeles, inconjuction with Cambridge University Press, 366 pages

Deck arch bridges
Bridges completed in 1942
Bridges over the Vltava
Písek District
Buildings and structures in the South Bohemian Region
1942 establishments in the Protectorate of Bohemia and Moravia